Maximilian Oberst (October 6, 1849 – November 18, 1925) was a German physician and surgeon born in Regensburg.

He studied medicine in Munich, and from 1874 to 1877 was an assistant in the surgical department at a hospital in Augsburg. From 1877 he worked as an assistant to Richard von Volkmann at Halle, obtaining his habilitation in 1881. In 1884 became an assistant professor at the University of Halle, and from 1894 to 1920 was director and chief physician at the Krankenhaus Bergmannstrost in Halle. In 1919 he attained the title of professor ordinarius (full professor).

He is credited for introducing a method of block anesthesia ("Oberst-block") for use in minor surgery of the finger. In 1882 he published  Die Amputationen unter dem Einflusse der antiseptischen Behandlung ("Amputations under the influence of antiseptic treatment").

References
Catalogus-professorum-halensis (translated biography)
Parts of this article are based on a translation of the equivalent article at the German Wikipedia.

External links
 Anesthesiology History of the Development and Evolution of Local Anesthesia Since the Coca Leaf.

German surgeons
People from Regensburg
Academic staff of the University of Halle
1849 births
1925 deaths
German anesthesiologists